Actual play, also called live play, is a genre of podcast or web show in which people play tabletop role-playing games (TTRPGs) for an audience. Actual play often encompasses in-character interactions between players, storytelling from the gamemaster, and out-of-character engagements such as dice rolls and discussion of game mechanics. The genre emerged in the early 2000s and became more popular throughout the decade, particularly with the 2015 debut of Critical Role, an actual play webseries featuring professional voice actors.

History 
According to Evan Torner writing in Watch Us Roll, actual play is rooted in phenomena including magazine "play reports" of wargames and internet forums dedicated to role-playing games. With the emergence of esports, livestreamed gaming, and Let's Plays, actual plays of TTRPGs became a popular podcast and webseries format, and contributed to the resurgence of TTRPGs in the 2010s and 2020s.

In 2008, the creators of Penny Arcade partnered with Wizards of the Coast to create a podcast of a few 4th Edition Dungeons & Dragons adventures which led to the creation of the Acquisitions Incorporated. After the podcast was well-received, the players began livestreaming games starting in 2010 at the PAX festival. Acquisitions Incorporated went on to be described by Inverse in 2019 as the "longest-running live play game". Critical Role, a web series in which professional voice actors play Dungeons & Dragons, launched in 2015. Critical Role has been credited by VentureBeat as responsible for making actual play shows "their own genre of entertainment", and has since become one of the most prominent actual play series. The Critical Role animated series The Legend of Vox Machina was crowdfunded on Kickstarter in 2019, where it raised , setting the record for the most highly-funded film or TV project in the platform's history. Following this, Amazon streaming service Prime Video acquired exclusive streaming rights to the series. Another popular series is The Adventure Zone, a comedic actual play podcast which has featured several TTRPG systems. , it received over 6million monthly downloads, and ranked highly on Apple podcast charts. The "Balance" campaign of The Adventure Zone was adapted into a series of graphic novels, the first of which was published in 2018. By 2021, there were hundreds of actual play podcasts.

In 2018, the Diana Jones Award for excellence in tabletop gaming named the concept of actual play as that year's award winner, marking the first year the award was not awarded to a game, organization, or individual.

TTRPG publishers have engaged with actual plays by licensing shows based on their products, running their own, incorporating content from actual plays back into source material, and playtesting games in actual play format. L.A. by Night is an actual play licensed by the publisher Paradox Interactive, and based on their role-playing game Vampire: The Masquerade; it premiered on Geek & Sundry in 2018. Rivals of Waterdeep is an official Wizards of the Coast actual play show, based on their Dungeons & Dragons system. Wizards of the Coast has also published collaboration sourcebooks based on actual play shows, such as the Explorer's Guide to Wildemount (2020) based on Critical Role and Acquisitions Incorporated (2019) based on the live play game by the same name.

Cultural impact 
Actual plays have contributed towards improving representation of people of color, women, and others in tabletop gaming, which has had a reputation of being primarily made up of white men. Maze Arcana's Sirens, with Satine Phoenix as dungeonmaster (DM), features an all-women group of players. Rivals of Waterdeep (DMed by Tanya DePass) and Into the Motherlands are actual play shows with casts that are entirely made up of people of color. Death2Divinity is an actual play show with an all-queer, "all fat-babe" cast.

Actual play shows have also been credited with improving representation of LGBT people in media more generally. Entertainment website CBR has said that LGBT representation has been more easily incorporated into actual plays because they are often produced by independent creators and distributed online. The site named The Adventure Zone and Dimension 20 as two examples of actual plays which include LGBT characters.

Amanda Farough wrote for VentureBeat that "the boundaries and barriers that have traditionally kept TTRPGs hidden behind an opaque divide have come tumbling down" and that actual play "long-form narrative is reshaping itself as an expression of both players and the audiences that accompany them on the journey ahead". Curtis D. Carbonell, in his book the Dread Trident: Tabletop Role-Playing Games and the Modern Fantastic, commented that shows such as Acquisitions Incorporated and Critical Role reflect "a wider phenomenon made clear by numerous Youtube.com videos of individual gaming sessions by random groups... The confluence of these digital and analog streamed elements adds to the increasing archive of realized gametexts that can be consumed and analyzed with the modern fantastic". Both Farough and Carbonell highlighted that actual play shows have also increased sales of TTRPGs and related products.

List of actual play media 

 Acquisitions Incorporated
 The Adventure Zone
 Critical Role and its spin-off Exandria Unlimited
 Dimension 20
 Dungeons & Daddies
 Friends at the Table
 The Glass Cannon
 HarmonQuest
 L.A. by Night
 Nerd Poker
 Not Another D&D Podcast
 Rivals of Waterdeep

See also 
 Fantasy podcast

References 

Actual play
Narrative forms
Role-playing games
Web series